The NANTEN2 Observatory is a southern sky observatory in the Atacama Desert of northern Chile. The observatory is equipped with a millimeter and submillimeter wave telescope that is used for southern sky observations of atomic and molecular spectral lines in 110 GHz to 880 GHz range. It is one of a number of observatories operating at Llano de Chajnantor Observatory. It is operated as a collaboration between research institutes in Japan (Nagoya University and Osaka University), South Korea (Seoul National University), Germany (KOSMA, Universität zu Köln, Argelander Institute for Astronomy at the University of Bonn), Australia (University of New South Wales, University of Adelaide, Macquarie University, Swinburne University of Technology, University of Sydney, University of Western Sydney) and Chile (Universidad de Chile).

The instrument was previously located at the Las Campanas Observatory from 1995 to 2004; it was known as the NANTEN millimeter-wavelength radio telescope back then.

See also
 List of astronomical observatories

References

Astronomical observatories in Chile
Buildings and structures in Antofagasta Region